Troy Township is one of fifteen townships in DeKalb County, Indiana. As of the 2010 census, its population was 304 and it contained 130 housing units.

Geography

Unincorporated towns
 Artic

Cemeteries
The township contains one cemetery, Eddy.

References
 United States Census Bureau cartographic boundary files
 U.S. Board on Geographic Names

External links

 Indiana Township Association
 United Township Association of Indiana

Townships in DeKalb County, Indiana
Townships in Indiana